In Ancient Roman measurement, the acetabulum was a measure of volume (fluid and dry) equivalent to the Greek  (oxybaphon). It was one-fourth of the hemina and therefore one-eighth of the sextarius. It contained the weight in water of fifteen Attic drachmae.

However, other sources estimate a higher value of perhaps  (see Ancient Roman units of measurement).

References

Units of volume
Ancient Roman units of measurement